The Lake Charles–Jennings combined statistical area is made up of three parishes in southwestern Louisiana. The statistical area consists of the Lake Charles Metropolitan Statistical Area and the Jennings Micropolitan Statistical Area. The largest principal city is Lake Charles, and the smaller principal city is Jennings. As of the 2010 census, the CSA had a population of 231,201. A July 1, 2019 estimate placed the population at 241,777.

Parishes
Calcasieu Parish
Cameron Parish
Jefferson Davis Parish

Communities

Cities
DeQuincy
Jennings (Principal city)
Lake Charles (Principal city)
Sulphur
Westlake

Towns
Elton
Iowa
Lake Arthur
Vinton
Welsh

Villages
Fenton

Census-designated places
Cameron
Carlyss
Hackberry
Hayes
Lacassine
Moss Bluff
Prien
Roanoke

Unincorporated places
Barnsdall
Bell City
Bellevue
Big Lake
Buller
China
Creole
Coverdale
Edna
Fontenot
Foreman's Hall
Gillis
Grand Chenier
Grand Lake
Gravel Point
Hathaway
Holly Beach
Johnson Bayou
Lauderdale
Mossville
Niblett
Panchoville
Pine Island
Raymond
Silverwood
Soileau
St. Anne
Starks
Thornwell
Topsy
Verrett
Walton
Woodlawn

Demographics
As of the census of 2000, there were 225,003 people, 83,865 households, and 60,291 families residing within the CSA. The racial makeup of the CSA was 75.47% White, 22.22% African American, 0.32% Native American, 0.57% Asian, 0.03% Pacific Islander, 0.40% from other races, and 0.99% from two or more races. Hispanic or Latino of any race were 1.33% of the population.

The median income for a household in the CSA was $32,447, and the median income for a family was $38,232. Males had a median income of $32,005 versus $19,724 for females. The per capita income for the CSA was $15,485.

See also
Louisiana census statistical areas
List of cities, towns, and villages in Louisiana
List of census-designated places in Louisiana

References

Geography of Calcasieu Parish, Louisiana
Geography of Cameron Parish, Louisiana
Geography of Jefferson Davis Parish, Louisiana
Acadiana
Combined statistical areas of the United States